Blood Diamond is a 2006 American political action thriller film directed and co-produced by Edward Zwick and starring Leonardo DiCaprio, Jennifer Connelly, and Djimon Hounsou. The title refers to blood diamonds, which are diamonds mined in war zones and sold to finance conflicts, and thereby profit warlords and diamond companies around the world.

Set during the Sierra Leone Civil War of 1991–2002, the film depicts a country torn apart by the struggle between government loyalists and insurgent forces. It also portrays many of the atrocities of that war, including the rebels' amputation of civilians' hands to discourage them from voting in upcoming elections.

The film's ending, in which a conference is held concerning blood diamonds, refers to a historic meeting that took place in Kimberley, South Africa, in 2000. It led to development of the Kimberley Process Certification Scheme, which sought to certify the origin of rough diamonds in order to curb the trade in conflict diamonds; the certification scheme has since been mostly abandoned as ineffective.

The film received mainly positive reviews, with praise directed toward the performances of DiCaprio and Hounsou. The film grossed $171 million worldwide and received five Oscar nominations, including Best Actor for DiCaprio and Best Supporting Actor for Hounsou. DiCaprio received a nomination for a Golden Globe Award for Best Actor – Motion Picture Drama (also nominated that year in the same category for The Departed). In addition, DiCaprio and Hounsou were nominated for Outstanding Male Actor in a Leading Role and Outstanding Male Actor in a Supporting Role at the 13th Screen Actors Guild Awards.

Plot
The film is set in 1999 in Sierra Leone, a West African nation ravaged by a decade of civil war. Rebel factions such as the Revolutionary United Front (RUF) frequently terrorize the countryside, intimidating Mende locals and enslaving many to harvest diamonds, which fund their increasingly successful war effort. Solomon Vandy a local fisherman from Shenge is captured. While his family escapes, Vandy is assigned to a workforce overseen by Captain Poison, a ruthless warlord.

While mining a river, Vandy discovers an enormous pink diamond. Captain Poison attempts to take the stone, but government troops raid the area. Vandy buries the stone before being captured. Both Vandy and Poison are incarcerated in the Sierra Leone capital of Freetown, along with Danny Archer, a Rhodesian smuggler and mercenary who was caught smuggling diamonds into Liberia. The diamonds were intended for Rudolph van de Kaap, a corrupt South African mining executive and a major player in the international diamond industry.

When Archer hears about the pink diamond, he arranges for himself and Vandy to be freed from detention. He travels to Cape Town to meet his employer, Colonel Coetzee, an Afrikaner formerly with the apartheid-era South African Defence Force. He now commands a private military company. Archer wants to sell the diamond so he can leave the continent forever, but Coetzee wants it as compensation for Archer's botched smuggling mission. Archer returns to Sierra Leone, locates Vandy, and offers to help him find his family if he helps recover the diamond.

Meanwhile, RUF insurgents escalate hostilities. Freetown falls and Vandy's son, Dia, is conscripted as a child soldier under a liberated Captain Poison. Archer and Vandy narrowly escape to Lungi, where Vandy is reunited with his wife and daughters in a refugee camp. He learns the RUF took his son. Vandy and Archer plan to reach Kono where Vandy buried the diamond. They are joined by Maddy Bowen, an American journalist who is working on an exposé of the illicit diamond trade. In exchange for Bowen's help, Archer promises to provide her the evidence she needs for her story.

Archer and Vandy, disguised as television journalists, travel with Bowen and a press convoy destined for Kono. Rebels ambush the convoy, forcing the three to flee. While trekking through the jungle, they encounter Kamajor militiamen, who take them to a friendly local named Benjamin Kapanay. The kindhearted Kapanay drives them to Kono, but an RUF child soldier injures him while en route. The trio arrive in Kono after a harrowing journey, where Coetzee and his private army—contracted by the Sierra Leone government—prepare to repulse the rebel offensive.

Archer gives Bowen the evidence and forces her to evacuate the country with other civilians; Archer and Vandy, having stolen weapons and supplies from Colonel Coetzee's army, set out for Captain Poison's encampment to retrieve the diamond. Along the way, the two men argue over what is the ultimate goal: Archer wants the diamond, while Vandy only wants to find his son.

At the encampment, Archer, seeing they are heavily outnumbered, calls Coetzee's army via satellite phone to request an airstrike. Vandy, desperate to find his son, sneaks into the encampment and locates Dia; due to Dia's brainwashing, he refuses to acknowledge his father. Vandy is captured but escapes when Coetzee's army arrives. Vandy finds and kills Captain Poison as the mercenaries overwhelm the RUF defenders. Coetzee takes Dia hostage and forces Vandy to produce the diamond, but Archer kills Coetzee after realizing the colonel will eventually kill them both. Dia briefly holds the pair at gunpoint, but Vandy is able to talk him down by reminding him of who he was. Pursued by vengeful mercenaries, Archer is mortally wounded. He entrusts the stone to Vandy, telling him to take it for his family. Vandy and his son rendezvous with Archer's pilot, who flies them to safety while Archer makes a final phone call to Bowen, in Cape Town; Archer asks Bowen to assist Vandy and his family, and gives permission for Mandy to finish her article before dying.

Vandy and Bowen meet in London, where they execute an undercover operation to expose the van de Kaap operation's dirty dealings. Vandy exchanges the pink diamond for £2 million pounds and a reunion with his entire family. Bowen publishes her exposé on the diamond trade and van de Kaap's criminal actions. Later, Vandy appears as a guest speaker at a conference on blood diamonds in Kimberley, where he is met with a standing ovation.

Cast

Production
Charles Leavitt was hired by Warner Bros. in February 2004 to rewrite an early draft of the film, then titled Okavango. The story had been stuck in development hell at the studio for years before producers Paula Weinstein and Gillian Gorfil finally decided on the story of an African farmer caught up in the conflict between an American smuggler and the local diamond mining organization. Leavitt researched the diamond industry at great length before he began writing the screenplay, explaining that he has "always been a stickler for immersing [himself] in research". He wrote the film with the assumption that it would offend the diamond industry, particularly De Beers, and so made sure to portray the industry truthfully, aware that he could potentially be sued by De Beers and other powerful mining corporations. Paula Weinstein was impressed by Leavitt's Blood Diamond draft, but hired writers Ed Zwick and Marshall Herskovitz to rewrite it. By the time he had completed the script, Zwick had become so interested in the story that he agreed to direct the film as well.

Release

Critical response

On Rotten Tomatoes the film has an approval rating of 63% based on reviews from 219 critics, with an average score of 6.30/10. The site's consensus states "Blood Diamond overcomes poor storytelling with its biting commentary and fine performances." On Metacritic it has a weighted average score of 64 out of 100, based on 39 reviews, indicating "generally favorable reviews". Audiences surveyed by CinemaScore gave the film a grade of A− on a scale from A to F.

Claudia Puig of USA Today gave the film a positive review, calling Blood Diamond "a gem in a season with lots of worthy movies". Puig also praised DiCaprio's acting, calling it "the first time the boyish actor has truly seemed like a man on film". Peter Rainer of The Christian Science Monitor also gave the film a positive review, and like Puig, praised DiCaprio's acting: "DiCaprio is remarkable—his work is almost on par with his performance this year in The Departed." William Arnold of the Seattle Post-Intelligencer gave the film a positive review, saying "Zwick's narrative skills keep us hooked on the story, and the first-rate production values and imaginative use of locations (it was shot in Mozambique) give the film an enthralling scope and epic sweep." Damon Wise of Empire magazine gave the film four out of five stars, saying "Great performances, provocative ideas and gripping action scenes fall prey to Hollywood logic and pat storytelling in the final hour." David Edelstein of New York magazine found the film exceeded his expectations: "Given that the movie doesn't have a single narrative surprise—you always know where it's going and why, commercially speaking, it's going there—it's amazing how good Blood Diamond is. I guess that's the surprise." Ann Hornaday of The Washington Post also praised DiCaprio's acting in both Blood Diamond and The Departed (released the same year), saying that he "has undergone a major growth spurt this year". She called the film as a whole "an unusually smart, engaged popcorn flick".

James Berardinelli of the ReelViews gave the film three out of four stars, saying "It's a solid performance from Leonardo DiCaprio, who has grown into this sort of gritty role and is more believable after having been seen dancing on the dark side in The Departed." Dana Stevens of Slate magazine wrote, "Blood Diamond is a by-the-numbers message picture, to be sure... But the director, Edward Zwick, is craftsman enough that the pace never slackens, the chase scenes thrill, and the battle scenes sicken. And if it makes viewers think twice about buying their sweethearts that hard-won hunk of ice for Christmas, so much the better." Ty Burr of The Boston Globe, after giving the film a positive review, stated: "As an entry in the advocacy-entertainment genre, in which glamorous movie stars bring our attention to the plight of the less fortunate, Blood Diamond is superior to 2003's ridiculous Beyond Borders while looking strident and obvious next to last year's The Constant Gardener.

Pete Vonder Haar of the Film Threat gave the film a mixed review, saying, "It's a reasonably entertaining actioner, and Zwick doesn't shy away from depicting violence or the horrors of war, but as a social statement it falls a little short. And emeralds are prettier anyway." Marc Savlov of The Austin Chronicle also gave the film a mixed review: "While the film never quite reaches the emotional peaks it so obviously seeks to scale, Zwick's film is still potent enough to save you three months salary." Nathan Lee of the Village Voice, like Vonder Haar and Savlov, also gave the film a mixed review, suggesting that "De Beers can relax; the only indignation stirred up by Blood Diamond won't be among those who worry about where their jewelry came from, but with audiences incensed by facile politics and bad storytelling". Scott Tobias of The A.V. Club gave the film a C grade: "Much like Zwick's Glory and The Last Samurai, Blood Diamond strives to be an important film while stopping well short of being genuinely provocative and artistically chancy." Mick LaSalle of the San Francisco Chronicle gave the film a negative review, arguing that "director Edward Zwick tried to make a great movie, but somewhere in the process he forgot to make a good one".

Box office performance
Blood Diamond opened on December 8, 2006, in the United States and Canada in 1,910 theaters. The film ranked at #5 on its opening weekend, accumulating $8,648,324, with a per-theater average of $4,527. The film's five-day gross was $10,383,962.

The film dropped down to #7 on its second weekend, accumulating $6,517,471 in a 24.6% drop from its first weekend, and per-theater average of $3,412. By its third weekend it dropped even more to #12 and made $3,126,379, with its per-theater average being $1,628.

Blood Diamond went on to gross $57,377,916 in the United States and Canada and $114,029,263 overseas. In total, the film has grossed $171,407,179 worldwide.

Accolades

Music

Blood Diamond: Original Motion Picture Soundtrack is the soundtrack to the film of the same name, released on December 19, 2006, by Varèse Sarabande. It was composed by James Newton Howard and won the Soundtrack of the Year award at the 2008 Classic Brit Awards.

Soundtrack

Home media
Blood Diamond was released on DVD in region 1 format on March 20, 2007. Both a single-disc and a two-disc version were released. The film has sold an estimated 3.6 million DVD units and has grossed $62.7 million in sales.

See also
 Conflict resource – Natural resources sold to fund war
 Resource curse – A phenomenon in which a resource-rich country develops more slowly than others

References

External links

  (May 2, 2007, archived version)
 
 
 
 

Film

2006 films
2006 action thriller films
2000s thriller drama films
2000s war drama films
2000s action drama films

American action drama films
American action thriller films
American adventure thriller films
American political thriller films
American thriller drama films

Films about child soldiers
Films about journalists
Films about mining
Gemstones in fiction
Films about mercenaries

Films scored by James Newton Howard
Films directed by Edward Zwick
Films produced by Graham King
Initial Entertainment Group films
Warner Bros. films

Films set in 1999
Films set in Sierra Leone

Categoeries 
2000s English-language films
Mende-language films
2000s American films